Blackheath is a suburb of Johannesburg, South Africa. It is located in Region B of the City of Johannesburg Metropolitan Municipality. Situated north-west of the Johannesburg CBD, it is north of the suburb of Northcliff.

History
The suburb originates in 1903 with 277 stands laid out over 84.5ha. It is named after Blackheath in London.

References

Johannesburg Region B